Qazaxlar or Kazakhlar or Kazakhyar may refer to:
Qazaxlar, Barda, Azerbaijan
Birinci Qazaxlar, Barda, Azerbaijan (formerly called Qazaxlar)
Qazaxlar, Fizuli, Azerbaijan
Qazaxlar, Goranboy, Azerbaijan